Launch Pad 0 (LP-0), also known as Launch Complex 0 (LC-0), or Launch Area 0 (LA-0), is a launch complex at the Mid-Atlantic Regional Spaceport (MARS) on Wallops Island, Virginia, in the United States. MARS is located adjacent to NASA's Wallops Flight Facility (WFF), which ran the launch complex until 2003. WFF continues to provide various support services to MARS launches under contract with the Commonwealth of Virginia.

The launch complex consists of three individual launch pads, LP-0A, LP-0B, and Launch Complex-2 (LC-2).

History

Pad 0A 

LP-0A was first built for the failed Conestoga rocket program. The original launch tower was subsequently demolished in September 2008. A new pad facility was built from 2009-2011 for Orbital Sciences Taurus II, now renamed Antares. Pad modifications for Antares included the construction of a Horizontal Integration Facility for launcher/payload mating and a wheeled transporter/erector that will roll out and erect the rocket on its launch pad about 24 hours prior to launch.
The first launch of Antares occurred on April 21, 2013.

The pad was reinforced with pilings and features a liquid fueling facility, flame trench, and deluge system for cooling and sound suppression.

On October 28, 2014, an Orbital Systems Antares rocket, flying as mission Cygnus CRS Orb-3, crashed 6 seconds after takeoff and appeared to have done significant damage to the launch pad itself. On October 29, 2014, teams of investigators began examining debris at the crash site. By May 2015, estimates had been revised down to around US$13 million. At that time, NASA had committed US$5 million, Virginia Commercial Space Flight Authority committed US$3 million and Orbital ATK US$3 million. Repairs were underway and planned to be completed by September 2015, but repairs were only funded up to August with Virginia CSFA requesting that Orbital provide the remaining US$2 million. On September 30, 2015, the spaceport announced repairs on pad 0A had been completed. The launch pad resumed flight operations with the Cygnus CRS OA-5 mission on October 17, 2016.

In March 2021, Rocket Lab announced that they would launch their upcoming medium-lift launch vehicle Neutron from LP-0A, with the initial launch planned for as early as 2024. However, Rocket Lab later opted to construct their own Neutron launch site south of Pad 0B.

Antares will continue flights from Pad 0A indefinitely, as Northrop Grumman transitions from the 200-series to the 300-series of the rocket. Said transition will require moderate renovations to the pad and surrounding facilities in order to support the upgrade rocket's larger first stage.

Pad-0B 

LP-0B became operational in 1999, and was subsequently upgraded in 2003 with the construction of a mobile service tower, which was completed in 2004. It is active, and is currently used by Minotaur rockets. The first launch from LP-0B was of a Minotaur I in December 2006, and was the first launch from the Mid-Atlantic Regional Spaceport.

On October 19, 2017, Vector Launch announced plans to conduct three launches from near Pad 0B with its then-in-development Vector-R small satellite launch vehicle over the subsequent two years, with an option for five additional launches. However, following the company's bankruptcy and restructuring, plans for these launches are unlikely.

Launch Complex-2 (Pad 0C) 
In October 2018, Rocket Lab announced that it had selected Mid-Atlantic as its second launch site (the launch site in Mahia had at the time 2 pads, so this was Rocket Lab's third launch pad) called Rocket Lab Launch Complex-2 (LC-2) or Launch Pad 0C. The new launch pad is near Pad 0A (and shares some systems with Pad 0A). Rockets launched from LC-2 are integrated at Rocket Lab's integration facility, located just a few miles away from the pad. They are transported to the pad and integrated onto the strongback.

In December 2019, construction was completed and Rocket Lab inaugurated Launch Complex 2 at Mid-Atlantic Regional Spaceport. In April 2020, Rocket Lab performed a Wet Dress Rehearsal with an Electron rocket on the pad.

The first launch from LC-2 successfully occurred on January 24, 2023. An Electron rocket carried three satellites to orbit in a mission named "Virginia is for Launch Lovers".

Launch statistics 

Chart excludes the only launch of Conestoga from pad 0A in 1995; the launch attempted to put a satellite into orbit but was unsuccessful. Chart also excludes the suborbital launch of ALV X-1 on 22 August 2008 from pad 0B.

References

Spaceports in the United States
Buildings and structures in Accomack County, Virginia
1995 establishments in Virginia